Genopole is a French research centre in Évry-Courcouronnes focused on biotherapies, genetics, genomics, post-genomics, xenobiology and the development of biotechnology industries.

As of 2018, it contains 17 academic research laboratories, 87 biotechnology companies, 20 scientific platforms and technical platforms shared around the University of Évry Val d'Essonne, one of the founding members of Paris-Saclay University.

Notable Researcher 
 Jean Weissenbach, French biologist

See also 
 Genoscope

References

External links 
 Official website

Genetics or genomics research institutions
High-technology business districts in France
Essonne
Organizations established in 2002
2002 establishments in France